Pamela Hutchinson (born 7 December 1953) is a British gymnast. She competed at the 1972 Summer Olympics.

References

External links
 

1953 births
Living people
British female artistic gymnasts
Olympic gymnasts of Great Britain
Gymnasts at the 1972 Summer Olympics
Place of birth missing (living people)
20th-century British women